The 2014–15 Ekstraklasa season was Lechia's 71st since their creation, and was their 7th continuous season in the top league of Polish football.

The season covers the period from 1 July 2014 to 30 June 2015.

Players

First-team squad

Transfers

Players In

Players Out

Friendlies

Summer

Winter

Regular season

Fixtures for the 2014–15 Ekstraklasa season

League table

Championship Group

League table

Polish Cup

Stats

Goalscorers

References

External links

Lechia Gdańsk seasons
Lechia Gdańsk